George Freemantle (born 14 March 1806, Easton, Hampshire; details of death unknown) was an English cricketer who was associated with Hampshire and made his first-class debut in 1829. His father was Andrew Freemantle of the Hambledon Club.

References

Bibliography
 

1806 births
Year of death unknown
English cricketers
English cricketers of 1826 to 1863
Hampshire cricketers
Players cricketers